William Stanhope may refer to:
William Stanhope (1626–1703), MP for Nottingham 
William Stanhope, 1st Earl of Harrington (c. 1690–1756), British statesman and diplomat
William Stanhope, 2nd Earl of Harrington (1719–1779), English politician, soldier and nobleman
William Stanhope, 11th Earl of Harrington (1922–2009), British captain and peer
William Stanhope (1702–1772), British Member of Parliament for Buckinghamshire and Lostwithiel